Susan Blanchard-Frank is an American actress, who is known for playing Mary Kennicott Martin, R.N. #2 on the soap opera All My Children from 1971 to 1975.

Early years 
Blanchard is from Westport, Connecticut. After an early desire to be a ballerina, she decided to become an actress. She attended Centenary College in New Jersey for two years before she sought a career in New York.

Career 
She is married to actor Charles Frank, who played her onscreen husband Dr. Jeff Martin #2 on All My Children. They also worked together in 1978 on the TV movie The New Maverick with James Garner and Jack Kelly and the following year on the short-lived prime-time television western series Young Maverick, a sequel to the 1957 series Maverick.

Her film credits include Russkies (1987), again opposite her husband Charles Frank, and the John Carpenter films Prince of Darkness (1987) and They Live (1988).

In 1976, she starred as Tina in the sitcom Mr. T and Tina.

Blanchard also played Nurse Sandra Cooper in the season 6 episode "Images" of M*A*S*H and had a recurring role as Maureen Mahaffey, a maid, in the series Beacon Hill. In Murder, she wrote, season 2, episode 7, she played Carolyn Hester Crane.

Blanchard was known for her attractive legs and was the television commercial spokesperson for No Nonsense, a brand of pantyhose, from 1976 to 1982.

References

External links

Living people
American soap opera actresses
Place of birth missing (living people)
Actresses from Seattle
People from Los Angeles
21st-century American women
Actresses from Los Angeles
Year of birth missing (living people)